Tribal Students Union or TSU is a Student organisation of Tripura, it is affiliated to Students' Federation of India. The TSU is the student wing of the Communist Party of India (Marxist) in Tripura.

Flag
On a white background, there will be a five-pointed green star in the middle of flag, to the left of the star will be written transversely TSU in green. The width and height ratio of the flag is 3:2.

Foundation day
The Foundation day is celebrated on 19 August every year with due dignity and pays tribute to the martyrs.

Activities
 12 Sept 2014: TSU strongly opposed the Tipraland, the separate state demanded by Indigenous People's Front of Tripura.
 12 Sept 2017: TSU and SFI together win the college council election in all 22 general degree colleges and secured 751 seats out of 778 seats.
 20 Dec 2019: TSU protest against CAA at Melarmath, Agartala.
 6 Jan 2020: TSU held demonstration to protest against the violence in Jawaharlal Nehru University and demanded the resignation of Home Minister Amit Shah for “failing to protect” students.
 3 Aug 2022: TSU held a protest by blocking the road of Agartala city demanding the deployment of adequate teachers in all the schools across the state.

See also
 Tribal Youth Federation
 Tripuri people
 Dasarath Deb
 Aghore Debbarma
 Tripura Janasiksha Samiti

References

External links

Organisations based in Tripura
Student organisations in India
Student organizations established in 1978
1978 establishments in Tripura